Lewes is the county town of East Sussex, England. The following is a list of those people who were either born or live in Lewes, or had some important contribution to make to the town.

A
John Agard (born 1949), poet, playwright and children's author, lives in Lewes.
Russell Ash (1946–2010), author of Top 10 of Everything and other non-fiction books
Daisy Ashford (1881–1972), juvenile novelist
B. T. S. Atkins (born 1931), lexicographer
Lucy Atkins (living), novelist
John Authers, financial journalist and writer

B
Marina Baker (born 1967), former actress/ model, journalist, children's author and politician
Norman Baker (born 1957), former Liberal Democrat MP for Lewes
Wynne Edwin Baxter (1844–1920), lawyer, translator, antiquarian and botanist
Honor Blackman (1925-2020), actor
Michael Brooks (born 1970), science writer
Arthur Brown (born 1942), musician, best known for his 1968 hit "Fire"
Asa Briggs (1921-2016), English Historian, second Vice-Chancellor of University of Sussex and created Baron Briggs of Lewes in 1976
Ralph Brown (born 1957), actor
Anthony Buckeridge (1912–2004), children's author, noted for his Jennings series, lived near Lewes from 1962 until his death.

C
Anna Campbell (born 1991), first British woman to die fighting for the Women's Protection Units
Philip Carr-Gomm (born 1952), leader of The Order of Bards, Ovates and Druids
Thomas Cobham (died 1327), Archdeacon of Lewes
Richard Challoner (1691–1781), Roman Catholic bishop
John Conolly (1794–1866), physician
Shirley Collins (born 1935), folk singer and collector
Henry William Crosskey (1826–1893), geologist and Unitarian minister

D
Nick Davies (born 1953), investigative journalist and author of Flat Earth News, he uncovered the News of the World phone hacking affair
Henry Dudeney (1857–1930), author and mathematician
Alice Dudeney (1866–1945), author and diarist
Roger Dean (born 1944), artist

E
John Ellman (1753–1832), farmer and stockbreeder
John Evelyn (1620–1706), writer, gardener and diarist

F
Julian Fane (1927-2009), author
Barry Fell (1917–1994), zoologist
John Fitzalan, 1st Baron Arundel (c. 1348–1379)
David Ford (born 1978), singer/songwriter
Julia Foster (born 1943), actress

G
Eve Garnett (1900–1991), author and illustrator
Walter Godfrey (1881–1961), architect, historian and antiquarian
John Sparkes Goldsmith (1878–1942), founder and first editor of The Ringing World
Sarah Gordy (born c. 1968), actress with Down syndrome
Sir William Gull, 1st Baronet (1816–1890), physician
Edward Castres Gwynne (1811–1888), Australian lawyer and politician

H
Denzil Dean Harber (1909–1966), ornithologist and Trotskyist
Ed Harcourt (born 1977), singer/songwriter
Julius Charles Hare (1795–1855), theologian and Archdeacon of Lewes
Edward Hargraves (1816–1891), Australian gold prospector
Hugh Harris, musician: guitarist with The Kooks
Jonathan Harvey (composer) (1939–2012), composer
John Berry Haycraft (1859–1923), professor of physiology 
Phil Hobden (born 1976), film producer
George Hutson (1889–1914), Olympic runner

I
James Iredell (1751–1799), American lawyer and Associate Justice of the Supreme Court of the United States

J
Alison Jolly (1937–2014), primatologist
Arthur M. Jolly (born 1969), writer
Sir Richard Jolly (born 1934), development economist

K
Peter Kellner (born 1946), journalist, political commentator, polling expert and president of YouGov
Paul Austin Kelly (born 1960), opera singer
Dame Grace Kimmins (1871–1954), social activist

L
 Eleanor of Lancaster (1311–1372), wife of Richard Fitzalan, 10th Earl of Arundel
Peter Love (died 1610), pirate, said to have been born in Lewes

M
Gideon Mantell (1790–1852), obstetrician, geologist and palaeontologist
Joan Maude (1908–1998), actress
John Maynard Smith (1920–2004), evolutionary biologist and geneticist
William McCrea (1904–1999), astronomer
Reginald Medhurst (1920–2009), cricketer

N
Grace Nichols (born 1950), poet, lives in Lewes.
William Nicholson (born 1948), writer

O
Patrick O'Brian CBE (1914–2000), author, novelist and translator, known for the Aubrey/Maturin series of sea stories, spent his childhood in Lewes.

P
Thomas Paine (1737–1809), revolutionary, inventor and intellectual
John Peckham (c. 1230–1292), Archbishop of Canterbury
Pleasance Pendred (1864-1948), suffragette and activist for women's rights
Brenda Pye (1907–2005), landscape artist

R
Thomas 'Clio' Rickman (1760–1834), brewer and pamphleteer
Richard Russell (1687–1759), physician (water cure)
James Reeves (1909-1978), writer and poet

S
Louis Francis Salzman (1878–1971), economic historian
Sir George Shiffner (1762–1842), politician
Professor Alasdair Smith (born 1949), economist and former Vice-Chancellor, University of Sussex
Anthony Stapley (1590–1655), Member of Parliament; one of the regicides of King Charles I
Noel Streatfeild (1895–1986), children's author

T
Sir John Tomlinson (born 1946), opera singer
Polly Toynbee (born 1946), journalist and writer
Nicholas Tucker (living), academic and writer

W
Edward Perry Warren (1860–1928), art collector
Margaret Weedon (1854–1930), archer, competed in the 1908 Summer Olympics in London.
John Jenner Weir (1822–1894), civil servant, entomologist and ornithologist
Barbara Willard (1909–1994), children's novelist
Mark Williams (actor) (born 1959), actor and comedian
Kenneth Woodroffe (1892–1915), first-class cricketer and British Army officer, killed in action in World War I
Virginia Woolf (1882–1941), novelist and essayist

Y
Philip Yorke, 1st Earl of Hardwicke (1690–1764), politician
Nicholas Yonge (c. 1560–1619), singer and publisher

Z

See also
 List of people from Sussex

References

 
East Sussex-related lists
Lewes